KCDS may refer to:

 Childress Municipal Airport (ICAO code KCDS)
 KCDS-LP, a low-power radio station (90.1 FM) licensed to serve Tucson, Arizona, United States